The Prača is a left tributary of the Drina in eastern Bosnia and Herzegovina. It source is in Pale, Bosnia and Herzegovina at an altitude of 1540 m. After 55 km it flows into the Drina in Ustiprača.

The Prača offers terrains for recreational fishing on salmonids and numerous other fish species, but is primarily an important spawning ground for huchen and nase, both of which enter the river from the Drina.

References

Rivers of Bosnia and Herzegovina
Glasinac plateau
Recreational fishing in Bosnia and Herzegovina
Hucho habitats in Bosnia and Herzegovina